Scott Beeks (born 12 August 1999) is an English footballer who is last known to have played as a midfielder or striker for IFK Mariehamn. His father, Steve Beeks, also played professional football. He also plays roundnet for Great Britain.

Career

Beeks started his career with Finnish third division side FC Åland before joining IFK Mariehamn in the Finnish top flight.

He has played college soccer for La Salle University. In the 2020-2021 season, Beeks was named to the Atlantic 10 All Rookie team.

References

External links
 

Expatriate soccer players in the United States
English expatriate sportspeople in the United States
English footballers
Expatriate footballers in Finland
Living people
1999 births
English expatriate sportspeople in Finland
IFK Mariehamn players
Association football forwards
Association football midfielders
English expatriate footballers